A common year starting on Tuesday is any non-leap year (i.e. a year with 365 days) that begins on Tuesday, 1 January, and ends on Tuesday, 31 December. Its dominical letter hence is F. The most recent year of such kind was 2019 and the next one will be 2030, or, likewise, 2014 and 2025 in the obsolete Julian calendar, see below for more.

Any common year that starts on Sunday, Monday or Tuesday has two Friday the 13ths: those two in this common year occur in September and December. Leap years starting on Monday share this characteristic. From July of the year that precedes this year until September in this type of year is the longest period (14 months) that occurs without a Friday the 13th. Leap years starting on Saturday share this characteristic, from August of the common year that precedes it to October in that type of year.

In this common year, Martin Luther King Jr. Day is on its latest possible date, January 21, Valentine's Day is on a Thursday, Presidents Day is on February 18, Saint Patrick's Day is on a Sunday, Memorial Day is on May 27, U.S. Independence Day and Halloween are on a Thursday, Juneteenth is on a Wednesday, Labor Day is on September 2, Thanksgiving is on its latest possible date, November 28, and Christmas is on a Wednesday.

Calendars

Applicable years

Gregorian Calendar 
In the (currently used) Gregorian calendar, along with Thursday, the fourteen types of year (seven common, seven leap) repeat in a 400-year cycle (20871 weeks). Forty-four common years per cycle or exactly 11% start on a Tuesday. The 28-year sub-cycle only spans across century years divisible by 400, e.g. 1600, 2000, and 2400.

400 year cycle

century 1:  2, 13, 19, 30, 41, 47, 58, 69, 75, 86, 97

century 2:  109, 115, 126, 137, 143, 154, 165, 171, 182, 193, 199

century 3:  205, 211, 222, 233, 239, 250, 261, 267, 278, 289, 295

century 4:  301, 307, 318, 329, 335, 346, 357, 363, 374, 385, 391

Julian Calendar 
In the now-obsolete Julian calendar, the fourteen types of year (seven common, seven leap) repeat in a 28-year cycle (1461 weeks). A leap year has two adjoining dominical letters (one for January and February and the other for March to December in the Church of England as 29 February has no letter). Each of the seven two-letter sequences occurs once within a cycle, and every common letter thrice.

As the Julian calendar repeats after 28 years that means it will also repeat after 700 years, i.e. 25 cycles. The year's position in the cycle is given by the formula ((year + 8) mod 28) + 1). Years 7, 18 and 24 of the cycle are common years beginning on Tuesday. 2017 is year 10 of the cycle. Approximately 10.71% of all years are common years beginning on Tuesday.

References 

Gregorian calendar
Julian calendar
Tuesday